Adarsh Public School (APS) is a senior secondary public school located in Vikaspuri in West Delhi, India. The school is affiliated with the Central Board of Secondary Education.

History and traditions
APS was founded by Dr. Bhagat Ram Sahgal, an educationist and social reformer, who laid the foundation of the school in 1936 in Lahore, Pakistan. After partition of India, the school was shifted to Amritsar in 1955. The school was then shifted to Vikaspuri in 1986.

Annual holidays include , Republic Day, and Independence Day, Gandhi Jayanti

Celebrations of Teacher's Day are organised by students of class 12th and the Student Council.

Infrastructure
The schools has buildings for kindergarten and other classes. Classes up to third have air-conditioners and third class has a separate building.

The school has a library, a music room, and a garden in front of the school. The school has a vast ground which contains a basketball court cum skating ring, and a volleyball court. The school has an auditorium, laboratories and Atal Tinkering Lab, too.

Sports
The school hosts the annual, two-day B.R. Memorial Roller Skating and Hockey Championship for speed skating and roller hockey.

The school has a basketball team.

Clubs
Clubs include Student Council, Eco Club, Interact Club, ACC, QCC and MUN.

References

Schools in West Delhi
High schools and secondary schools in Delhi
1955 establishments in India